Mikhail Aleksandrovich Stakhovich (20 January 1861, in Oryol Governorate – 23 September 1923, in Aix-en-Provence) was a Russian politician.

Stakhovich was elected to the Duma in 1906 as an Octobrist and again to the second Duma in 1907, leading the Party of Peaceful Renovation.

He was appointed Governor-General of Finland by the Russian Provisional Government on 20 March 1917 after the job was refused by Vladimir Dmitrievich Nabokov amongst others. He resigned on 17 September.

After the Governor-General's post, Stakhovich was pointed as Ambassador to Madrid but he never reached the destination before the October Revolution.

Stakhovich died in exile in Aix-en-Provence, France in 1923. He was buried in Sainte-Geneviève-des-Bois Russian Cemetery, in the southern suburbs of Paris.

Awards 

 Order of Saint Anna, 2nd class
 Order of St. Vladimir, 3rd class

References

|-

1861 births
1923 deaths
People from Stanovlyansky District
People from Yeletsky Uyezd
Octobrists
Party of Peaceful Renovation politicians
Members of the 1st State Duma of the Russian Empire
Members of the 2nd State Duma of the Russian Empire
Governors of the Grand Duchy of Finland
Imperial School of Jurisprudence alumni
Emigrants from the Russian Empire to France